Greenwood Commercial Historic District is a national historic district located at Greenwood, Johnson County, Indiana. The district encompasses 25 contributing buildings in the central business district of Greenwood. It developed between about 1860 and 1935, and includes notable examples of Italianate, Romanesque, and Classical Revival style architecture. Notable buildings include the Grafton Peek Building (1887), former Odd Fellows Hall (c. 1905), former Masonic Lodge (1909), G.W. Clemmons Block (1906), and the Interurban Public Service Company and Interurban Station (c. 1915).

It was listed on the National Register of Historic Places in 1991.

References

Historic districts on the National Register of Historic Places in Indiana
Italianate architecture in Indiana
Neoclassical architecture in Indiana
Romanesque Revival architecture in Indiana
Historic districts in Johnson County, Indiana
National Register of Historic Places in Johnson County, Indiana